In the Catholic Church, a eucharistic congress is a gathering of clergy, religious, and laity to bear witness to the Real Presence of Jesus in the Eucharist, which is an important Roman Catholic doctrine. Congresses bring together people from a wide area, and typically involve large open-air Masses, Eucharistic adoration (Blessed Sacrament), and other devotional ceremonies held over several days. Congresses may both refer to National (varies by country) and International Eucharistic Congresses.

Paschal Baylón is considered the patron saint of such eucharistic congresses.

History

The first International Eucharistic Congress owed its inspiration to Bishop Gaston de Ségur, and was held at Lille, France, on June 21, 1881. The initial inspiration behind the idea came from the laywoman Marie-Marthe-Baptistine Tamisier  (1834-1910) who spent a decade lobbying clergy. The sixth congress met in Paris in 1888, and the great memorial Church of the Sacred Heart on Montmartre was the center of the proceedings. Antwerp hosted the next congress in 1890, at which an immense altar of repose was erected in the Place de Meir, and an estimated 150,000 persons gathered around it when Cardinal Goossens, Archbishop of Mechelen, gave the solemn benediction. Bishop Doutreloux of Liège was then president of the Permanent Committee for the Organization of Eucharistic Congresses, the body which has charge of the details of these meetings. Of special importance also was the eighth congress, held in Jerusalem in 1893, as it was the first congress held outside Europe.

In 1907, the congress was held in Metz, Lorraine, and the German government suspended the law of 1870 (which forbade processions) in order that the usual solemn procession of the Blessed Sacrament might be held. Each year the congress had become more and more international in nature, and at the invitation of Archbishop Bourne of Westminster the nineteenth congress was held in London, the first among English-speaking members of the Church. The presidents of the Permanent Committee of the International Eucharistic Congresses, under whose direction all this progress was made, were:
 Bishop Gaston de Ségur of Lille; Archbishop de La Bouillerie, titular of Perga and coadjutor of Bordeaux;
 Archbishop Duquesnay of Cambrai;
 Cardinal Mermillod, Bishop of Lausanne and Geneva, Switzerland;
 Bishop Doutreloux of Liège, Belgium;
 Bishop Thomas Louis Heylen of Namur, Belgium.
After each congress this committee prepared and published a volume giving a report of all the papers read and the discussions on them in the various sections of the meeting, the sermons preached, the addresses made at the public meetings, and the details of all that transpired.

The International Eucharistic Congresses

See also
Pontifical Committee for International Eucharistic Congresses
Real presence of Christ in the Eucharist
World Youth Day

References

Bibliography

External links

Official websites 
 congressieucaristici.va – Official site of the Pontifical Committee for the International Eucharistic Congresses
 Pontifical Committee for International Eucharistic Congresses (archive website)
 iec2016.ph – Official Website for the 2016 International Eucharistic Congress
 iec2020.hu/en – Official Website for the 2020 International Eucharistic Congress

Historic websites 
 The 1926 Cardinal's Train to the 28th International Eucharistic Congress in Chicago at ThemeTrains.com.
  [CC-By-SA]
 49th International Eucharistic Congress (2008): Photo Gallery by The Catholic Photographer

Miscellaneous 
 Eucharistic Congresses on New Advent Catholic Encyclopedia

 
1881 introductions